The 1945 Pittsburgh Steelers season was the franchise's 13th season in the National Football League (NFL). The team finished the season with a record of 2–8. This season marked the first and only season played with Jim Leonard as head coach.

Regular season

Schedule

Game summaries

Week 1 (Tuesday September 25, 1945): Boston Yanks 

at Fenway Park, Boston, Massachusetts

 Game time: 
 Game weather: 
 Game attendance: 27,502
 Referee: 

Scoring Drives:

 Boston – J. Martin 5 run (Lio kick)
 Boston – F. Martin 53 pass from Cafego (Lio kick)
 Boston – Manders 1 run (Lio kick)
 Pittsburgh – Lucente 60 lateral from Bova after 10 pass from Jarvi (Naioti kick)
 Boston – Manders 2 run (Lio kick)

Week 2 (Sunday, October 7, 1945): New York Giants  

at Forbes Field, Pittsburgh, Pennsylvania

 Game time: 
 Game weather: 
 Game attendance: 20,097
 Referee: 

Scoring Drives:

 New York – FG Strong 21
 New York – FG Strong 42
 Pittsburgh – Duhart 3 run (kick failed)
 New York – Filpowicz – 10 pass from Herber (Strong kick)
 New York – Leibel 38 pass from Herber (Strong kick)
 New York – Piccolo 7 fumble run (Strong kick)

Week 3 (Sunday October 14, 1945): Washington Redskins  

at Forbes Field, Pittsburgh, Pennsylvania

 Game time: 
 Game weather: 
 Game attendance: 14,050
 Referee: 

Scoring Drives:

 Washington – Dye 13 pass from Baugh (Aguirre kick)
 Washington – Rosato 3 run (Aguirre kick)

Week 4 (Sunday October 21, 1945): New York Giants  

at Polo Grounds, New York, New York

 Game time: 
 Game weather: 
 Game attendance: 43,070
 Referee: 

Scoring Drives:

 Pittsburgh – Lucente 3 run (Naioti kick)
 Pittsburgh – Warren 1 run (Naioti kick)
 Pittsburgh – Doyle 50 interception (Naioti kick)
 New York – Livingston 15 pass from Herber (Strong kick)

Week 5 (Sunday October 28, 1945): Boston Yanks  

at Forbes Field, Pittsburgh, Pennsylvania

 Game time: 
 Game weather: 
 Game attendance: 25,447
 Referee: 

Scoring Drives:

 Boston – FG Lio 19
 Pittsburgh – FG Agajanian 19
 Pittsburgh – FG Agajanian 25
 Boston Martin 25 lateral from Currivan after 27 pass from Gudmundson (Lio kick)

Week 6 (Sunday November 4, 1945): Philadelphia Eagles  

at Forbes Field, Pittsburgh, Pennsylvania

 Game time: 
 Game weather: 
 Game attendance: 23,018
 Referee: 

Scoring Drives:

 Pittsburgh – FG Agajanian 31
 Philadelphia – Ferrante 26 pass from Zimmerman (kick failed)
 Philadelphia – Ferrante 65 pass from Zimmerman (Zimmerman kick)
 Philadelphia – Van Buren 20 run (kick failed)
 Philadelphia – Meyer 27 pass from Zimmerman (Zimmerman kick)
 Philadelphia – Banta 22 run (kick failed)
 Philadelphia – Bleeker 14 run (Zimmerman kick)
 Philadelphia – Karnofsky 19 run (kick failed)

Week 7 (Sunday November 11, 1945): Chicago Cardinals  

at Forbes Field, Pittsburgh, Pennsylvania

 Game time: 
 Game weather: 
 Game attendance: 13,153
 Referee: 

Scoring Drives:

 Pittsburgh – FG Agajanian 15
 Pittsburgh – Dudley 1 run (Dudley kick)
 Pittsburgh – Dudley 1 run (kick failed)
 Pittsburgh – Warren 75 run (Dudley kick)

Week 8 (Sunday November 18, 1945): Philadelphia Eagles  

at Shibe Park, Philadelphia, Pennsylvania

 Game time: 
 Game weather: 
 Game attendance: 23,838
 Referee: 

Scoring Drives:

 Philadelphia – Karnofsky 12 run (Zimmerman kick)
 Pittsburgh – Kiick 1 run (kick failed)
 Philadelphia – Van Buren 3 run (kick failed)
 Philadelphia – FG Zimmerman 30
 Philadelphia – Van Buren 6 run (Zimmerman kick)
 Philadelphia – Steele 4 run (Rogalla kick)

Week 9 (Sunday November 25, 1945): Chicago Bears  

at Wrigley Field, Chicago, Illinois

 Game time: 
 Game weather: 
 Game attendance: 20,689
 Referee: 

Scoring Drives:

 Chicago Bears – McAffee 33 run (Gudauskas kick)
 Pittsburgh – Dudley 4 run (Agajanian kick)
 Chicago Bears – McAfee 65 pass from Luckman (Gudauskas kick)
 Chicago Bears – Grygo 33 pass from Luckman (Gudauskas kick)
 Chicago Bears – McAfee 2 run (Gudauskas kick)

Week 10 (Sunday December 2, 1945): Washington Redskins  

at Griffith Stadium, Washington, DC

 Game time: 
 Game weather: 
 Game attendance: 34,788
 Referee: 

Scoring Drives:

 Washington – Bagarus 70 pass from Baugh (Aguirre kick)
 Washington – Turley 10 pass from Baugh (Aguirre kick)
 Washington – FG Aguirre 26
 Washington – Bagarus 29 pass from Baugh (Aguirre kick)

Standings

References

Pittsburgh Steelers seasons
Pittsburgh Steelers
Pitts